The Tunisian Classico is the name given to matches between Espérance de Tunis and Étoile du Sahel football clubs from Tunis and Sousse, Tunisia.

History
Called in Tunisia Clasico on the model of the Spanish El Clásico between Real Madrid and Barcelona. It is one of the most important rivalries in Tunisian football. They are considered the most crowned titles in Tunisia, with a total of 98 titles, 17 of which are continental titles. The two teams met for the first time in the 1944–45. Their first match ended in a 0–0 draw. Since then, they have played their matches regularly, with the exception of the 1961–62 season, when Étoile du Sahel was disbanded. The two teams met in the Tunisian Cup final five times. The first was in 1957 and ended with the victory of Espérance de Tunis, For the first time two teams from Tunisia have met in a continental competition in the group stage of the 2005 CAF Champions League and in both matches they ended in a draw, the two teams were both champions and runners-up in the same season seventeen times, including five consecutive times between 1999–2000 and 2003–04.

All-time head-to-head results

All-Time Top Scorers

Honours

League matches

Tunisian Cup results

International results

Shared player history

Players who have played for both clubs

  Imed Ben Younes (Étoile du Sahel 1995–98, Espérance de Tunis 2003)
  Chamseddine Dhaouadi (Étoile du Sahel 2011–12, Espérance de Tunis 2013–20)
  Mejdi Traoui (Étoile du Sahel 2002–08, Espérance de Tunis 2010–14)
  Franck Kom (Étoile du Sahel 2011–16, Espérance de Tunis 2017–19)
  José Clayton (Étoile du Sahel 1995–98, Espérance de Tunis 2001–05)
  Kandia Traoré (Espérance de Tunis 2001, Étoile du Sahel 2002, 2004–05)
  Amine Ltaïef (Espérance de Tunis 2000–02 & 2005–09, Étoile du Sahel 2011–13)
  Karim Aouadhi (Espérance de Tunis 2012–14, Étoile du Sahel 2018–19)
  Riadh Jelassi (Étoile du Sahel 1995–2000, Espérance de Tunis 2001–04)
  Hamdi Nagguez (Étoile du Sahel 2013–18, Espérance de Tunis 2020–21)

Coaches who managed both clubs

  Roger Lemerre (Espérance de Tunis 1983–84, Étoile du Sahel 2013–14 & 2018–19 & 2021–2022)
  Michel Decastel (Espérance de Tunis 2001–03, Étoile du Sahel 2008)
  Faouzi Benzarti (Étoile du Sahel 1986–87, 1991–92, 2006–07, 2012, 2014–17 & 2019, Espérance de Tunis 1993–94, 2003, 2007, 2008–10, 2017)

Tunisian Ligue Professionnelle 1 results

The tables list the place each team took in each of the seasons.

References

Espérance Sportive de Tunis
Étoile Sportive du Sahel
Football rivalries in Tunisia